A central securities depository (CSD) is a specialized financial organization holding securities like shares, either in certificated or uncertificated (dematerialized) form, allowing ownership to be easily transferred through a book entry rather than by a transfer of physical certificates.  This allows brokers and financial companies to hold their securities at one location where they can be available for clearing and settlement.  This is usually done electronically, making it much faster and easier than was traditionally the case where physical certificates had to be exchanged after a trade had been completed.

In some cases these organizations also carry out centralized comparison, and transaction processing such as clearing and settlement of securities transfers, securities pledges, and securities freezes.

Scope 
A CSD can be national or international in nature, and may be for a specific type of security, such as government bonds.

Domestic central securities depository
Many countries have one domestic CSD that was traditionally associated with the national stock exchange.  These organizations are typically heavily regulated by the government and may or may not be separate from the exchanges where trading in securities occurs.

International central securities depository (ICSD)
An international CSD is a central securities depository that settles trades in international securities such as eurobonds although many also settle trades in various domestic securities, usually through direct or indirect (through local agents) links to local CSDs.  Examples of international CSDs include Clearstream (previously Cedel), Euroclear and SIX SIS.  While viewed as a national CSD rather than an ICSD, the US Depository Trust Company (DTC) does hold over $2 trillion in non-US securities and in American depositary receipts from over 100 nations.

Functions
 Safekeeping Securities may be in dematerialized form, book-entry only form (with one or more "global" certificates), or in physical form immobilized within the CSD.  
 Deposit and withdrawal Supporting deposits and withdrawals involves the relationship between the transfer agent and/or issuers and the CSD.  It also covers the CSD's role within the underwriting process or listing of new issues in a market.
 Dividend, interest, and principal processing, as well as corporate actions including proxy voting Paying and transfer agents, as well as issuers are involved in these processes, depending on the level of services provided by the CSD and its relationship with these entities. 
 Other services CSDs offer additional services aside from those considered core services.  These services include  securities lending and borrowing, matching, and repo settlement, or ISIN assistance.
 Pledge - Central depositories provide pledging of share and securities.  Every country is required to provide legal framework to protect the interest of the pledger and pledgee.

However, there are risks and responsibilities regarding these services that must be taken into consideration in analyzing and evaluating each market on a case-by-case basis.

See also
Clearing house
Custodian bank
Securities market participants (United States)

References

External links
 CSD Associations
 Asia Pacific Central Securities Depository Group
 European Central Securities Depositories Association
 America's Central Securities Depositories Association
 Association of Eurasian Central Securities Depositories
 Africa & Middle East Depositories Association 

 National CSDs

 Argentinian CSD
 Armenian CSD
 Oman CSD
 Australian CSD for government securities
 Australian CSD for equities and corporate bonds
 Austrian CSD
 Azerbaijan CSD
 Bangladesh CSD
 Bahrain CSD
 Belgian CSD
 Belgian CSD for government securities
 Bosnian and Herzegovian CSD
 Brazilian CSD for equities
 Brazilian CSD for coporporate bonds
 Brazilian CSD for government securities
 Bulgarian CSD
 Canadian CSD
 Chilean CSD
 Chinese CSD
 Croatian CSD
 Cypriot CSD
 Czech CSD
 Danish CSD
 Egyptian CSD
 Estonian CSD
 Finnish CSD
 French CSD
 German CSD
 German CSD for government securities
 Greek CSD
 Greek CSD for government securities
 Hong Kong CSD
 Hungarian CSD
 Icelandic CSD
 Indian CSD 1
 Indian CSD 2
 Indonesian CSD
 Iranian CSD
 Irish CSD
 Israeli CSD
 Italian CSD
 Japanese CSD
 Japanese CSD for government securities
 Latvian CSD
 Lithuanian CSD
 Macedonian CSD
 Malaysian CSD
 Maldivian CSD
 Maltese CSD
 Mexican CSD
 Mongolian CSD
 Moroccan CSD
 New Zealand CSD
 Nigerian CSD
 Norwegian CSD
 Pakistani CSD
 Peruvian CSD
 Philippine CSD
 Polish CSD
 Portuguese CSD
  Qatar CSD
 Romanian CSD
 Romanian CSD for government securities
 Russian CSD
 Serbian CSD
 Singapore CSD
 Slovak CSD
 Slovenian CSD
 South African CSD (GraniteCSD)
 South African CSD
 South Korean CSD
 Spanish CSD
 Sri Lankan CSD
 Swedish CSD
 Swiss CSD
 Taiwanese CSD
 Thai CSD
 Tunisian CSD
 Turkish CSD
 Ukrainian CSD
 UK CSD
 Uruguayan CSD
 US CSD
 US CSD for government securities
 Venezuelan CSD
 Vietnamese CSD
 Zimbabwean CSD

 International CSDs
 Euroclear Bank
 Clearstream Banking Luxembourg, CBL
 SIX SIS
 globeSettle

Payment systems
Securities (finance)
Central securities depositories
Financial law